Edward Paul Lukon (1920-1996) was a Major League Baseball outfielder. He played all or part of four seasons in the majors, all for the Cincinnati Reds. Lukon's nickname was "Mongoose".

in 213 games over four seasons, Lukon posted a .236 batting average (143-for-606) with 64 runs, 23 home runs, 70 RBI and 60 bases on balls. He finished his career with a .989 fielding percentage as an outfielder.

Sources

Major League Baseball outfielders
Cincinnati Reds players
Valdosta Trojans players
Knoxville Smokies players
Columbus Red Birds players
Syracuse Chiefs players
Los Angeles Angels (minor league) players
Baseball players from Pennsylvania
1920 births
1996 deaths
People from Canonsburg, Pennsylvania